Petaluma Transit is the public bus service in the city of Petaluma, Sonoma County, California. The system connects with several Sonoma County Transit routes for further travel within the county, Golden Gate Transit routes for travel between the city, Marin County, and San Francisco, and Sonoma County Airport Express routes for travel between the city, Oakland International Airport, and San Francisco International Airport.

Hours of operation are Monday through Friday between 6:20 a.m. and 6:15 p.m., and on Saturday from 7:20 a.m. to 5:45 p.m., with no evening or Sunday, service. Saturday service is provided on some holidays. 

Petaluma Paratransit provides ADA-mandated paratransit for eligible persons within Petaluma City Limits.

Routes serving Petaluma
PT = Petaluma Transit, SCT = Sonoma County Transit and GGT = Golden Gate Transit

Paratransit
Petaluma Paratransit is the paratransit arm of Petaluma Transit, providing transportation for ADA-eligible persons in the city. Trips can be reserved for travel Monday through Friday, 6:20am to 6:15pm, and Saturday, 7:20am to 5:45pm. Trips must be reserved at least one day in advance. Patrons must be registered with Petaluma Paratransit prior to booking trips.

References

External links
Petaluma Transit
Information from Transit.511.org
 Petaluma Transit routes and descriptions
 Copeland Street Transit Mall

Bus transportation in California
Public transportation in Sonoma County, California
Petaluma, California